The Banieya Dam is an embankment dam on the Samou River in the Kindia Region of Guinea. The dam was completed by 1969 for the purpose of water supply. The Kale Dam, which also supports a hydroelectric power station, is located downstream.

See also

 Energy in Guinea
 List of power stations in Guinea

References

Dams completed in 1969
Energy infrastructure completed in 1988
Dams in Guinea
Hydroelectric power stations in Guinea
Earth-filled dams
Kindia Region